Fikri Karayel (born 7 February 1987) is a Turkish Cypriot rock singer and songwriter.

He was born in Zodeia, where he lived throughout his childhood. He was named after his grandfather, Fikri Karayel, a popular sportsman after whom the local primary school and Fikri Karayel Stadium were named. He was inspired and helped by the local band SOS, and he quickly developed a passion for music. He started singing at the fifth year of the primary school and had his first performance to a broad audience at the Orange Festival of Morphou. He went on to study biochemistry at the Kingston University; meanwhile, he joined the band Refik and started composing songs that became popular. He performed before concerts of Turkish bands such as Duman and thus developed a Turkish Cypriot fan base, during this time, he became known in Turkey as Haluk Levent performed one of his songs.

His first popular song was "Şehit" ("Martyr"). "Trenler" ("Trains"), "Hayal Edemezsin" ("You Can't Imagine") and "Morgue" ("Morg") are other popular songs by Karayel; "Hayal Edemezsin" was especially a great hit in Turkey as it became very popular among alternative music listeners, remaining at number 1 on Myspace Turkey for two years. In 2014, he performed the soundtrack for the Turkish-Turkish Cypriot movie Seni Seviyorum Adamım ("I Love You Man") and received the best singer award from the Near East University. In 2015, he released his first album, Zor Zamanlar ("Hard Times") and gave his first concert in Istanbul, Turkey.

Discography

Studio albums

Zor Zamanlar (2014)

Uzaktan (2021)

Singles

Songs written

References 

1987 births
Living people
21st-century Cypriot male singers
Cypriot male singer-songwriters
Turkish Cypriot singers
People from Nicosia District
Turkish Cypriot expatriates in the United Kingdom
Alumni of Kingston University